Htoo Eain Thin (born Kyaw Myint Lwin; 1 July 1963 – 14 August 2004) was one of the most popular and respected Burmese singer-songwriters. He brought a new style of pop rock music to the Burmese music scene in mid-1980s, and was popular till his death in 2004. He released 14 solo albums in his 18-year career. His songs remain Burmese standards and his premature death is still mourned by millions of fans.

Background 
Htoo Eain Thin was born on 1 July 1963 in Pathein in the Irrawaddy Division to a Burman father (Tun Myint) and a Mon mother (Mya Yin). He graduated from Basic Education High School No. 3 Pathein in 1979, and attended Pathein Regional College for two years. In 1981, his entire family moved to Mawlamyaing, and he enrolled in a correspondence course at the University of Mawlamyine, graduating with a Bachelor of Science degree in physics in 1984. After graduation, he studied formal music education under a well known music instructor Aung Soe (KC Francis). Htoo Eain Thin played the guitar, the bass guitar, the piano, the harmonica and the drums.

Musical career 
Htoo Eain Thin is widely remembered for his heart-felt songs with his own original music and lyrics. Being an "original" songwriter means a lot in Myanmar. When he released his first album Naryi Baw Mha Myet-Yay Zet Mya (Tear Drops on the Clock) in 1986, the Burmese pop music scene was (and still to a lesser extent is) dominated by Burmese covers of Western pop and country music—known locally as "copies".

To be sure, Htoo Eain Thin's musical style was heavily influenced by Western jazz, rock-and-roll and pop music. Some critics complained that his sound was still too "derivative" or "emulative", comparing his compositions and arrangements to those of the Bee Gees or the Beatles. But it was his ability to bring Burmese soulfulness (some would say wailing quality) to his lyrics and combine it with Western-fused arrangements that proved ever so popular with generations of Burmese—male and female alike. His style was unique, even compared to that of other contemporary singer-songwriters like Soe Lwin Lwin and Kaiser.

Like most Burmese songs, many of his songs are about love and heart-ache, only areas that could safely pass through draconian Burmese media censors, which did not (and still don't) tolerate even a hint of social commentary. His 1991 ode Yazawin Mya Ye Thado-Thami (The Bride of History) raised a few eyebrows. Although the song ostensibly is about Myanmar's main artery Irrawaddy river, many took it to be as an implicit reference to Aung San Suu Kyi. He was banned from performing the song in his concerts.

Within the confines of Burmese censors, one topic he wrote extensively about was the mother's love, the relationship between the mother and the son, and a son's regrets. He devoted an entire album A-May (Mother) to this topic. The song A-May Ein (Mother's Home) continues to resonate deeply with many Burmese home and especially, abroad.

His success with Naryi was followed by a string of successful albums, culminating in Atta Bon Saung Khe Mya, and Akyinna Einmet, both released in 1991. His songs from this early era are still very popular today. In particular, Mei-Lai-Taw (Just Forget It), Min-Ma-Shi-De-Nauk (Since You've Been Gone) and Hsway-De (Longing) remain standards to this day. His success waned in later albums though he remained popular. He even resorted to covering a few Western songs—something that did not sit well with some of his purist fans. His last albums—in particular the posthumous Chit-Chin Ah-Phyint (With Love)--saw a return to his musical roots that captivated generations of Burmese.

Htoo Eain Thin also composed many commercially successful songs for other singers. A successful singer, Aung Yin has publicly acknowledged that he owes his success to his saya (teacher) Htoo Eain Thin. Hayma Ne Win, a popular female singer, has covered many of Htoo Eain Thin's popular songs.

Premature death 
Htoo Eain Thin died suddenly in 2004 of heart disease. He was survived by his wife, Thwè Thwè Htwe, and daughter, Mi Kun Htaw.

Album discography 
Htoo Eain Thin released 15 solo albums. His last album remains unreleased.

 Naryi Baw Mha Myet Yay Set Myar -Tear Drops on the Clock(1986)
 Mhaw Sayar Eainmet – Dream of a Wizard (1988)
 Thet Nyein – Tranquillity (1989)
 Atta Pon Saung Khae Myar – Crystal Of Ego (1991)
 Akyinna Eainmet Dream of Affection(1991)
 A Yin A Taing – Just Like Old Times (1991)
 Zaga Lon Ma Shi Tae Kaungkin – Sky Without Words (1995)
 Htoo Eain Thin Unplugged Live (1996)
 Myo Pya La Yaung Tan Chin (1996)
 Win Yoe Sune Mee – Polar Flame (1997)
 A May (Tho) A Kywin Mae Metta Taw Thi Chin – Mother (or) Owner Of Endless Love (1997)
 A Mhat Ta Ya Dan Ya Thi Chin Mya – Songs For Memorial Scars Of Life (1999)
 A Sein Yaung Yet Swe Myar – Green Dates (2001)
 Ta Nae Sar A Lwe Myar – Mistakes of the Day (2003)
 Chit Chin Ah Phyint – With Love (2005)
 Nhit Cho' Waing (unreleased)

References

1963 births
2004 deaths
20th-century Burmese male singers
21st-century Burmese male singers
Burmese singer-songwriters
Burmese pop singers
Burmese people of Mon descent
People from Mawlamyine
People from Ayeyarwady Region